= Shopping precinct =

See:

- For Pedestrian precinct, see Pedestrian zone
- For shopping centres, see Shopping mall
